Rasie Michael Bailey (February 14, 1939 – August 4, 2021), better known as Razzy Bailey, was an American country music singer-songwriter and musician. In the early 1980s, he scored 5 No. 1's on the Billboard country music charts.

Early life
Bailey was born in Five Points, Alabama, United States, and raised on a farm in La Fayette, Alabama. Bailey got his first experience of musical performance as a member of his high school's Future Farmers of America string band. After graduation, he married and had children immediately and had little time to pursue his career, but he spent many years playing occasional gigs at honkytonks in Georgia and Alabama and developing his songwriting.

Early releases
In 1966, Bailey took his material to Bill Lowery at Atlantic Records, who arranged for him to record "9,999,999 Tears" backed by a studio band featuring Billy Joe Royal, Joe South, and Freddy Weller. The song failed to hit the charts at that time, but Bailey was encouraged, forming the pop trio Daily Bread which released a pair of albums on small labels. Another group, The Aquarians, followed in 1972; in 1974, Bailey recorded the album I Hate Hate simply as "Razzy." It sold over half a million copies before being picked up by MGM Records.

Career at RCA
In 1976, Dickey Lee recorded "9,999,999 Tears", and it became a country and pop hit in 1976, and in 1977, Lee repeated this with another Bailey tune, "Peanut Butter," which also went into the charts. As his songwriting talents became known, Bailey signed with RCA Records and, in 1978, began releasing singles of his own songs. His first hit as a singer-songwriter, "What Time Do You Have To Be Back in Heaven?", was on the charts for over four months. Bailey charted a total of seven No. 1 singles on Billboard's "Country" charts and another eight Top 10 in the late 1970s and early 1980s. His sound combines R&B influences with country; his version of Wilson Pickett's "In the Midnight Hour" was a country hit. His last country No. 1 hit was with "She Left Love All Over Me" in 1982.

Bailey had three double sided number 1's in succession on the Country chart, a feat never accomplished by any other artist.

He also operated Razzy's Hit House, his recording studio where he helped other artists with their projects.

Personal life
Bailey died in August 2021, at the age of 82.

Discography

Albums

Singles

A"I Hate Hate" peaked at No. 67 on the Billboard Hot 100 and No. 50 on the RPM Top Singles chart in Canada.
BB-side to "Midnight Hauler."

Music videos

References

External links
Razzy Bailey's home website
CMT bio
 
 

1939 births
2021 deaths
People from Chambers County, Alabama
People from LaFayette, Alabama
American country singer-songwriters
RCA Records artists
Country musicians from Alabama
Singer-songwriters from Alabama